Horizons is the fourth studio album by American singer-songwriter Kris Allen. It was released on August 12, 2014, by Allen's independent label, DogBear Records. Allen also organized a Stageit show as a release party for the record where he performed the full album set and also a song called Unique. A portion of the proceeds from the album go to benefit Music Empowers Foundation.

Background

Allen was dropped by RCA Records in 2012, after releasing two albums - Kris Allen (2009) and Thank You Camellia (2012) - through the label. He released Horizons independently through his own label, DogBear Records.

As a result of an accident which broke his wrist, Allen had to change his approach to music making for this album, in particular he began to use a finger-picking style of guitar playing. According to Allen, "it’s a different way to play and some of those songs  were written when my hand was in a cast so all I had was my fingers. I think it made me a bit more melodic than just strumming a bunch of chords." He sought out the producer Charlie Peacock to produce his album.  Peacock introduced Allen to a number of people, including Lenachka with whom he recorded "Prove It to You".  "Prove It to You" was released as the lead single from the album on July 7, 2014.

Commercial performance
The album debuted on the Billboard 200 at No. 80 with 4,000 copies sold for the week in the US.

Track listing

Charts

Personnel

Kris Allen — Acoustic guitar, beat box, electric guitar, primary artist, vocals
Sam Ashworth — Clapping, engineer, percussion, stomping, vocals
Richie Biggs — Engineer, mastering, mixing
CP — Engineer
Richard Dodd — Mastering
Cody Fry — Programming, vocals
Mark Hill — Bass
Evan Hutchings — Drums

Andy Leftwich — Fiddle, mandolin
Ken Lewis — Percussion
Brenton Little — Design, Photography
Andrew St. Marie — Piano
Jerry McPherson — Electric guitar 
Charlie Peacock — Keyboards, percussion, piano, producer, programming
K.S. Rhoads — Piano
James Sweeting — Clapping, engineer, production coordination, programming, stomping

Release dates

References

External links

2014 albums
Albums produced by Charlie Peacock
Kris Allen albums